Mike L. Fleiss (born April 14, 1964) is an American television producer and writer.

Early life
Fleiss was raised in Fullerton, California. He attended the University of California, Berkeley.

Career
He is the creator, producer and writer of The Bachelor, The WB's Superstar USA, The Bachelorette, The Will and High School Reunion. His first reality TV romance show was Who Wants to Marry a Multi-Millionaire?  He was also the producer of the 2003 remake The Texas Chainsaw Massacre and its 2006 prequel The Texas Chainsaw Massacre: The Beginning and the films Hostel (2005), Hostel: Part II (2007), and Hostel: Part III (2011). In 2008, his Next Entertainment production company signed a deal with Warner.

Personal life
His 24-year marriage to his high school sweetheart, Alexandra Vorbeck, ended in 2012.

He married former Miss America, Laura Kaeppeler, in April 2014. The couple's son, Benjamin, was born in May 2015. On July 10, 2019, Fleiss filed for divorce from Kaeppeler, citing irreconcilable differences.

Legal issues
In November 2014, Fleiss was criminally charged for harassing Baywatch star David Charvet and his wife, actress Brooke Burke; the case was eventually dismissed.
In July 2019, Fleiss' then-wife Laura Kaeppeler alleged that he physically assaulted her while she was pregnant after he "demanded she get an abortion", prompting the Kauai Police Department to lead a criminal investigation. Two weeks later, Kaeppeler dropped the assault charges and received a $10-million settlement.

References

External links
 

Living people
American film producers
American television producers
American television writers
American male television writers
1964 births
People from Fullerton, California
University of California, Berkeley alumni